The Kobulashvili (Kobulidze) was a Georgian noble family whose origins can possibly be traced back to K'obul, High Constable of Iberia (fl. 637/642), commemorated in the inscription from the Monastery of the Holy Cross at Mtskheta.

The family was subsequently established in the Kingdom of Kakheti and confirmed as princes (knyaz Kobulov, Кобуловы) of the Russian Empire in 1826.

References 

Noble families of Georgia (country)
Russian noble families
Georgian-language surnames